Dermot Nesbitt (born 14 August 1947) is a former Ulster Unionist Party (UUP) politician from Northern Ireland who was a Member of the Legislative Assembly (MLA) for South Down from 1998 to 2007.

Nesbitt was educated at Down High School and later studied economics at Queen's University Belfast and joined the Ulster Unionist Party (UUP). He was the election agent for Brian Faulkner from 1973–77, most of this period spent as a member of the Unionist Party of Northern Ireland. Nesbitt worked as a lecturer at Queen's and by 1981 he had rejoined the UUP, being elected to Down District Council. He held this seat until 1989.

Nesbitt was elected to the Northern Ireland Forum for South Down in 1996, and held this seat on the Northern Ireland Assembly at the 1998 and 2003 elections.

Nesbitt was a junior minister in the Office of the First Minister and Deputy First Minister of Northern Ireland from 1998 until 2002, when he took up the post of Minister of the Environment. He retired in 2007, and party colleague John McCallister retained a UUP seat in the South Down constituency. At the 1997, 2001 and 2005 general elections, Nesbitt stood unsuccessfully for the Westminster seat of South Down. 

He continued to work as a lecturer in finance at QUB until his early 70s. 

In mid-morning on 7 December 1983, while chatting to UUP party and Queen's colleague Edgar Graham at the University Square side of the main campus library, Graham (aged 29) was shot in the head a number of times by an IRA gunman and died almost instantly. Two persons were later convicted of withholding evidence from the police, but no one was ever convicted for Graham's murder.

Nesbitt lives in Crossgar where his family have lived for several generations. He has been involved in many community and church activities in the area.

References

Biographies: Dermot Nesbitt
Aristotle: Dermot Nesbitt

1947 births
Living people
Members of the Northern Ireland Forum
Ministers of the Northern Ireland Executive (since 1999)
Members of Down District Council
Ulster Unionist Party councillors
Ulster Unionist Party MLAs
Northern Ireland MLAs 1998–2003
Northern Ireland MLAs 2003–2007
Unionist Party of Northern Ireland politicians
Academics of Queen's University Belfast
Junior ministers of the Northern Ireland Assembly (since 1999)